The 1943 Northwestern Wildcats football team represented Northwestern University in the 1943 Big Ten Conference football season. The Wildcats finished 6–2, including 5–1 in conference play, were ranked ninth in the final AP Poll, and outscored their opponents by a combined score of 189 to 64 on the season. 

This was future Pro Football Hall of Famer Otto Graham's third and final season as a player at Northwestern.

Schedule

Awards and honors
At the season's end, star quarterback Otto Graham was named the Big Ten's Most Valuable Player, finished third in Heisman Trophy balloting, and earned first-team All-American honors as selected by the Associated Press.

Players selected in the 1944 NFL draft

References

Northwestern
Northwestern Wildcats football seasons
Northwestern Wildcats football